A bone cyst or geode is a cyst that forms in bone.

Types include:
 Unicameral bone cyst
 Aneurysmal bone cyst
 Traumatic bone cyst

Diagnosis
On CT scans, bone cysts that have a radiodensity of 20 Hounsfield units (HU) or less, and are osteolytic, tend to be aneurysmal bone cysts.

In contrast, intraosseous lipomas have a lower radiodensity of -40 to -60 HU.

Treatment and Prevention

Simple (Unicameral) Bone Cyst
Some unicameral bone cysts may spontaneously resolve without medical intervention. Specific treatments are determined based on the size of the cyst, the strength of the bone, medical history, extent of the disease, activity level, symptoms an  individual is experiencing, and  tolerance for specific medications, procedures, or therapies. The types of methods used to treat this type of cyst are curettage and bone grafting, aspiration, steroid injections, and bone marrow injections. Watchful waiting and activity modifications are the most common nonsurgical treatments that will help resolve and help prevent unicameral bone cysts from occurring and reoccurring.

Aneurysmal Bone Cyst
Aneurysmal bone cysts can be treated with a variety of different methods. These methods include open curettage and bone grafting with or without adjuvant therapy, cryotherapy, sclerotherapy, ethibloc injections, radionuclide ablation, and selective arterial embolization. En-block resection and reconstruction with strut grafting are the most common treatments and procedures that prevent recurrences of this type of cyst.

Traumatic Bone Cyst
The traumatic bone cyst treatment consists of surgical exploration, curettage of the osseous socket and bony walls, subsequent filling with blood, and intralesional steroid injections. Young athletes can reduce their risk of traumatic bone cyst by wearing protective mouth wear or protective headgear.

History 

Aneurysmal bone cysts are benign neoformations which can affect any bone. More than half occur in the metaphysis of long bones (especially femur and tibia) and between 12 and 30% in the spine. They were described in 1893 by Van Arsdale, who called these lesions "homerus ossifying haematoma". In 1940 Ewing used the term "aneurismal" to describe these lesions. Jaffé and Lichtenstein first coined the term "aneurismal cyst" in 1942 In 1950 they modified this term to "aneurismal bone cyst". They may be associated with bone tumors.

The simple bone cyst is a common, benign, fluid-containing lesion, most commonly found in the metaphysis of long bones, typically the proximal humerus or femur. Pathologic fractures are common, often with minor trauma. These cysts typically resolve after skeletal maturity and are not typically associated with bone tumors. The cause  is unknown. These were first recognised as a distinct entity in 1910. Jaffe and Lichtenstein provided a detailed discussion of simple bone cysts in 1942.

The traumatic bone cyst, also referred to as a simple bone cyst or hemorrhagic cyst, is a pseudocyst that most commonly affects the mandible of young individuals. It is a benign empty or fluid-containing cavity within the mandible body that does not have evidence of a true epithelial lining. This type of bone cyst is a condition found in the long bones and jaws. There is no definitive cause, though it relates to trauma in the oral region. The likelihood of males being affected by this condition is frequently greater than in females. It appears on radiographs as a unilocular radiolucent area with an irregular but well-defined outline. This term was first described by Lucas in 1929.

References

External links 

Musculoskeletal disorders